Urlătoarea may refer to the following rivers in Romania:

 Urlătoarea, a tributary of the Crasna in Buzău County
 Urlătoarea, a tributary of the Pănicel in Brașov County
 Urlătoarea (Prahova), a tributary of the Prahova in Prahova County

See also
 Urlătoarea Mare River (disambiguation)
 Urlătoarea Mică River (disambiguation)